Heinrich Freiherr von Cocceji (25 March 1644 – 18 August 1719) was a German jurist from Bremen. He studied in Leiden and Oxford and was appointed professor of law at Heidelberg (1672) and in Utrecht (1688). Named Geheimrat and marquis, he became ordinary professor in the faculty of law at Frankfurt (Oder), where he later died.

Cocceji's main opus, the Juris publici prudentia (Frankf. 1695) was for a long time the main compendium for German state law. Widely circulated is his Anatomia juris gentium (Frankf. 1718).  His other works include Juris feudalis hypomnemata (Frankf. 1702, 1715, 1727) and Disputatio Juridica, De concursu plurium jurisdictionum in eodem loco (Heidelberg n.d.).

References

External links

1644 births
1719 deaths
Jurists from Bremen (state)
Barons of Germany
Alumni of the University of Oxford
Leiden University alumni
Academic staff of Heidelberg University
Academic staff of Utrecht University
Academic staff of European University Viadrina